Rave Now (Chinese: 即刻电音; pinyin: jí kè diàn yīn) is a Chinese electronic music talent reality show. The show premiered on Tencent Video on December 1. Lay Zhang, Laure Shang and Wowkie Zhang are the mentor for the show, featuring Alan Walker as the guest mentor. It featured Rocket Girls 101 as guest appearance.

Mentors

Program Format

Show background 
With the rapid increase of electronic music festivals in China, the development of electronic music in China has steadily increased, especially with the accumulation of a large number of electronic music fans. On the other hand, the public's lack of awareness of electronic music, coupled with insufficient cultural accumulation of electronic music, has slowed the development of original electronic music in China. As Tencent Video’s self-produced variety show in the fourth quarter of 2018, Rave Now creativity is an important core of the model. Electronic music is the expression of creative young people. It is the most popular type of music for young people, and young people are also a very creative generation. The launch of "Rave Now" not only showed the creativity of Chinese EDM people, but also made Chinese EDM well known to the public.

Show format 
The program invites outstanding electronic musicians from around the world to participate in the selection and selection, and select a group of outstanding electronic music works and powerful musicians from multiple perspectives such as professional recommendation, live performance, and visual presentation. In terms of the competition system, "Rave Now" adopts a producer competition mode. The program uses the three attitude keywords of "original leader", "wild road" and "weird" to let the players choose their own groups. Among the contestants, in addition to many music lovers, there are also Panta.Q, Dirty Class, Anti-General and other producers who are already well-known in China's domestic electronic voice circle. The program group used subtitles to mark the professional terms such as the type of music performed by the players, the effector used, and the rhythm and drum beats. After the gathering and carnival of the "Electronic Music Port", electronic musicians enter the Holding Room to wait for the unknown test.

Producers experienced cruel and fierce assessments such as breakout battles, team breakout battles, original matchmaking, and the host team show, and finally the top five in the country Jiang Liang, Anti-General, Jasmine, Tao Leran and Xue Bote were born. The top five producers in the country and Qi Yitong & Dong Zilong, who returned smoothly with the advantage of the instant electronic music ranking, entered the finals together. The night of the annual finals adopts a full live broadcast mode. Six groups of producers experienced multiple rounds of competition among Rocket Girls 101 Feat. The champion candidates were determined by the online popularity rankings.

Program List

Staging Information

References

Talent shows